Chabeuil is a commune of the Drôme department in southeastern France.

Population

Notable people 
 Lauriane Doumbouya, French-born First Lady of Guinea (2021 - present)

See also
Communes of the Drôme department

References

Communes of Drôme